Chernyshevsky is a rural locality (a settlement) in Mokhovsky Selsoviet, Aleysky District, Altai Krai, Russia. The population was 87 as of 2013. There are 2 streets.

Geography 
Chernyshevsky is located 35 km northwest of Aleysk (the district's administrative centre) by road. Mokhovskoye is the nearest rural locality.

References 

Rural localities in Aleysky District